The Vorderkaiserfelden Hut is an alpine hut in the Kufstein district, Austria. It has a good view over the Inn valley and Kufstein and across to the Mangfall Mountains and the Wilder Kaiser.

Description
The hut is managed by the German Alpine Club's Oberland section. It has a 56 dormitory mattresses, 20 beds in double rooms and 11 in multibed rooms.

The Vorderkaiserfelden Hut is open year-round except three weeks in December and after Easter. It can be accessed from Kufstein, the hike takes about 2.5 hours, or from Ebbs, also within about 2.5 hours.

Already in 1889, a hut with 6 communal bunks and 14 beds existed.

Access 
by bus from Munich in 1h 15min to Kufstein station
by bus from Kufstein station on line 4030 to Sparchen or to Ebbs/Reit "Cafe Zacherl"
by car to the payment car park at the entrance to the Kaisertal valley in the Kufstein suburb of Sparchen.

Approaches 
 from Kufstein-Sparchen via Sparchenstiege, Veitenhof and Rietzaualm in 2.5 hours.
 from Ebbs/Reit via the "Musikantenweg" (No.811) in 3 hours.
 from the Gasthof "Zur Schanze" via the Rietzaualm in 2.5 hours.

Crossings 
 Stripsenjochhaus (1,577 m) via Höhenweg, Hochalm and Feldalm saddle, duration: 4 hours
 Anton Karg Haus and Hans Berger Haus via the Hechleitenalm, easy, duration: 2 hours

Ascents 
 Naunspitze (1,633 m), medium, duration: 45 minutes
 Petersköpfl (1,745 m), medium, duration: 1 hour
 Pyramidenspitze (1,998 m), via the Zahmer Kaiser plateau, medium, duration: 2.5 hours
 Pyramidenspitze (1,998 m), via Hinterkaiserfeldenalm, medium, duration:  2.5 hours
 Vordere Kesselschneid (2,002 m), via Höhenweg, Ochsweidkar cirque, medium, duration: 3 hours
 Route to the Zahmer Kaiser over the Pyramidenspitze with descent through the Winkelkar cirque to Durchholzen.
 various climbing routes on the Naunspitze, the Petersköpfl and the Steingrubenwand as well as the Heimköpfl climbing garden (Klettergarten).

Gallery

References

External links

 Official website of Vorderkaiserfelden 
 Website of the German Alpine Club 
 Description by Cicerone Press 
Site of the Oberland Branch of the DAV 

Mountain huts in Tyrol (state)
Kaiser Mountains